A mammoth is an extinct mammal and close relative to the modern elephant.

Mammoth may also refer to:

Mammoths
 List of mammoths
 Dwarf mammoth
 Woolly mammoth

Places
 Mammoth Cave (disambiguation), several cave systems around the world named “Mammoth”
 Mammoth Creek (disambiguation)
 Mammoth Mountain (disambiguation)
 Mammoth Site (disambiguation)
 Mammoth Spring (disambiguation)

United States

California
 Mammoth Mountain Ski Area, a major ski area in Mono and Madera Counties, California
 Mammoth Cave, California, a former settlement in Calaveras County
 Mammoth Lakes, California, an incorporated town in Mono County

Other states
 Mammoth, Arizona, a town in Pinal County
 Mammoth, Missouri, a community in Ozark County
 Mammoth, Montana, a census-designated place in Madison County
 Mammoth, Pennsylvania, a community in Westmoreland County
 Mammoth, Utah, a semi-ghost town in Juab County
 Mammoth, West Virginia, a community in Kanawha County
 Mammoth, Wyoming, a community in Park County
 Mammoth Cave National Park, Kentucky
 Mammoth Glacier, Wind River Range, Wyoming
 Mammoth Hot Springs and Mammoth Hot Springs Historic District, Yellowstone National Park, Wyoming

Media and culture

Theatre, film and television
 Mammoth (play), a 1990 Bulgarian play
 Mammoth (2006 film), a 2006 Sci Fi Channel movie
 Mammoth (2009 film), a 2009 Lukas Moodysson motion picture
 Mammoth (Zoids), a mecha from the fictional Zoids universe
 Mammoth, a fish in the American television series FishCenter Live

Music
 Mammoth Records, an American record label
 "Mammoth" (Interpol song), a 2007 song by Interpol
 "Mammoth" (Dimitri Vegas, Moguai and Like Mike song), a 2013 song by Dimitri Vegas, Moguai, and Like Mike
 "Mammoth", a song by The Devil Wears Prada from their fourth full-length album Dead Throne
 Mammoth, a 2011 album by Swedish progressive rock band Beardfish
 Mammoth, the initial name of the band Van Halen
 Mammoth WVH, a band founded by Wolfgang Van Halen and named in reference to his father's band

Literature
 Mammoth (comics), a DC comics supervillain
 Mammoth (novel), a 2005 science fiction novel by John Varley

Other uses
 Mammoet (Dutch for "mammoth"), a large heavy-haulage firm
 Mammoth, a brand of basketball systems made by Lifetime Products
 Mammoth (ride), a ProSlide water slide at Holiday World & Splashin' Safari in Santa Claus, Indiana
 Mammoth (shire), the largest horse on record
 Colorado Mammoth, a professional box lacrosse team
 The Mammoth, a  view camera made in 1900 by George Raymond Lawrence
 Mammoth, a fictional car and aircraft manufacturer in Grand Theft Auto V

See also

 
 
 Mammoth Mammoth, Australian band
 Mammut (disambiguation)
 Mastodon (disambiguation)
 Elephant (disambiguation)